Ronald Frank Aldrich (15 February 1916 – 30 September 1993) was a British easy listening and jazz pianist, arranger, conductor and composer.

Early life 
He was born Ronald Frank Aldrich on 15 February 1916 in Erith, England, the only son of a store manager. He started playing the piano at three years old and was educated at the Harvey Grammar School in Folkestone and learned violin at the Guildhall School of Music and Drama. He travelled to India in the late 30s ahead of World War Two to play jazz and first gained fame in the 1940s as the leader of a Royal Air Force band called The Squadronaires who had a twenty-year-long career before they disbanded in 1964.

Education and career 
Aldrich was educated at The Harvey Grammar School, Folkestone, and taught violin at the Guildhall School of Music and Drama. Before the Second World War, he went to India to play jazz and first gained fame in the 1940s with the Squadronaires, which he led from 1951, when the band was then billed as Ronnie Aldrich and The Squadronaires, up until their disbanding in 1964.

Aldrich was noteworthy for the recording development of playing two pianos in his recordings (the Decca Phase 4 Stereo series). He recorded for the Decca Record Company Ltd in the 1960s and 1970s, moving to Seaward Ltd (his own company) licensed to EMI in the 1980s. He also regularly broadcast on BBC Radio 2 with his own orchestra as well as with the BBC Radio Orchestra and the BBC Scottish Radio Orchestra, based at BBC Glasgow. Aldrich also recorded special tracks that were released by Reader's Digest. All the Decca recordings have been released on CD format by Vocalion. Many of his sessions for radio stations have been released by Apple iTunes in m4a format.

He was appointed musical director at Thames Television, and thus was widely known as the musical director for the television programme The Benny Hill Show. 
He was married twice and had a daughter from his first marriage. At the time of his death, he was married to Edith Mary Aldrich, his wife for more than 30 years. He died of prostate cancer at age 77 in the Isle of Man.

Discography 

His work has been released in different formats: LP (vinyl), single (vinyl), cassette, 8-track, open reel (stereo & quadraphonic), CD and recently digital (mp3, m4a).

Ronnie Aldrich and the Squadcats
 All Time Hits of Jazz, Ace of Clubs (ACL 1020) 1960 Remastered and re-released 13/10/09 as "All Time Jazz Hits", on double CD with "Top of the World".

Decca Discography "Ronnie Aldrich And His Two Pianos"
 Melody and Percussion for Two Pianos, Decca Phase 4 PFS34007 (SP-44007) 1961
 Ronnie Aldrich and His Two Pianos, Decca Phase 4 PFS4019 (SP-44018) 1962
 The Magnificent Pianos of Ronnie Aldrich, London Phase 4 SP-44029 1963
 The Romantic Pianos of Ronnie Aldrich, London Phase 4 SP-44042 1964
 Christmas with Ronnie Aldrich, London Phase 4 SP-44051 1964
 The Magic Mood of Ronnie Aldrich, Decca Phase 4 PFS4064 (SP-44062) 1965
 That Aldrich Feeling, Decca Phase 4 PFS4076 (SP-44070) 1965
 All-Time Piano Hits, London Phase 4 SP-44081 1966
 Where The Sun Is, Decca Phase 4 PFS4106 1966
 Two Pianos in Hollywood, Decca Phase 4 PFS4108 (SP-44092) 1967 (*)
 Two Pianos Today!, Decca Phase 4 PFS4132 (SP-44100) 1967
 For Young Lovers, Decca Phase 4 PFS4141 (SP 44108) 1968
 This Way "In", Decca Phase 4 PFS4152 (SP-44116) 1968
 It's Happening Now, Decca Phase 4 PFS 4159 (SP-44127) 1969
 Destination Love, Decca Phase 4 PFS4179 (SP 44135) 1969
 Togetherness, Decca Phase 4 DDS 2, 1970
 Here Come the Hits!, London Phase 4 SP-44143 1970 (**)
 Close to You, London H-17156 1970 (**)
 Love Story, Decca Phase 4 PFS4222 (SP-44162) 1971
 Great Themes To Remember, Decca Phase 4 1971
 Invitation To Love, Decca Phase 4 PFS4242 (SP-44176) 1972
 Come to Where the Love Is, Decca Phase 4 PFS4264 (SP 44190) 1972
 The Phase 4 World of Burt Bacharach, Decca Phase 4 SPA193, 1972
 Soft And Wicked, Decca Phase 4 PFS4268 (SP-44195 H-17195) 1973
 Top of the World, London Phase 4 SP-44203, 1973
 The Way We Were, Decca Phase 4 PFS4300 (SP 44209) 1974
 In the Gentle Hours, Decca Phase 4 PFS 4329 (SP-44221), 1975
 Love, Decca Phase 4 PFS4361 (SP 44253) 1975
 Reflections, Decca Phase 4 PFS4377 (SP-44264) 1976
 Webb Country, Decca Phase 4 PFS4397 (SP-44278) 1977
 With Love & Understanding, Decca Phase 4 PFS4406 (SP-44286) 1977 (Evergreen USA)
 Melodies from the Classics, Decca Phase 4 PFS 4424(SP-44300) 1978
 Emotions, Decca Phase 4 PFS4436 (SP-44310) 1978

(PFS is the Decca (UK) original catalogue number; SP is the London label (USA) version) /
(*) Also issued as "Romantic Screen Themes" in Japan (London SLC4484) /
(**) Togetherness (UK double-disc set) was issued as two separate albums in the USA

Decca (Polygram) Discography (One Piano)
 Tomorrow's Yesterdays, Decca PFS4436 1979
 For The One You Love, Decca SKL5319 1980

Amberjack Discography (One Piano)
 One Fine Day, Amberjack 902, 1981
 Imagine, Amberjack 1981
 Beautiful Music, Amberjack 1982
 Silver Bells/Winter Wonderland, Amberjack

Seaward Music recordings licensed to EMI (One Piano)
 Night Birds, EMI MFP 1982
 Sea Dreams, EMI MFP 1984
 For All Seasons, EMI MFP 6016 1987
 Ronnie Aldrich, his Piano and Orchestra, EMI CC220 1988 (compilation album)

Seaward also issued a vinyl LP, The Wonderful World of Man, which contained recordings of the sounds of the Isle of Man, where Ronnie Aldrich lived from the 1960s onwards.  This record was sold in the island to tourists.

Decca Discography "The New Big Band"
 Today - In The Old Fashioned Way, Decca Phase 4  1971

Themes recorded by album

Melody and Percussion for Two Pianos 
 Unforgettable - Gordon
 Secret Love - Webster/Fain
 To Each His Own - Livingstone/Evans
 Ruby - Roemheld/Parish
 April in Portugal - Ferrao/Kennedy
 My One and Only Love - Mellin/Wood
 Autumn Leaves - Kosma/Mercer
 Misty - Garner/Burke
 Golden Earrings - Young
 Young at Heart - Richards/Leigh
 April Love - Webster/Fain
 The Gypsy - Reid

Ronnie Aldrich and His Two Pianos 
 Liebestraum - Liszt
 Reverie - Debussy
 Story of a Starry Night - Hoffman/Curtis/Livingstone
 Till the End of Time - Kaye/Mossman
 Story of Three Loves - Paganini, arr. Rachmaninoff
 Full Moon and Empty Arms - Kaye/Mossman
 Stranger in Paradise - Wright/Forrest
 Clair de Lune - Debussy, arr. Aldrich
 Baubles, Bangles and Beads - Wright/Forrest
 Theme from "Goodbye Again" - Auric/Langdom
 Tonight We Love - Worth, Austin/Martin
 I'm Always Chasing Rainbows - Carroll /McCarthy

The Magnificent Pianos of Ronnie Aldrich 
 Ebb Tide - Maxwell
 The Very Thought of You - Noble
 I'll Be Seeing You - Fain
 Love Letters - Young
 Long Ago and Far Away - Jerome Kern
 How Deep is the Ocean - Berlin
 Smoke Gets in Your Eyes - Jerome Kern
 Stella by Starlight - Young
 Among My Souvenirs - Nicholls
 Darn That Dream - Van Heusen
 Evening Star - R. Aldrich
 Where or When - Rodgers

The Romantic Pianos of Ronnie Aldrich 
 Deep Purple - DeRose
 More Than You Know - Youmans
 I'll never smile again - Lowe
 Embraceable you - Gershwin
 Don't blame me - McHugh/
 I have dreamed - Rodgers/Hammerstein
 September song - Weill/Anderson
 I'm in the mood for love - McHugh/Fields
 If I loved you - Rodgers/Hammerstein
 Lonely lover - R. Aldrich
 Moonlight in Vermont - Blackburn/Suessdorf
 Spring will be a little late this year - Loesser

Christmas with Ronnie Aldrich 
 White Christmas - Berlin
 Let it snow - Cahn/Styne
 Winter wonderland - Bernard/Smith
 Silver bells - Evans/Livingstone
 Sleigh ride - Leroy Anderson
 Have yourself a merry little Christmas - Martin/Blane
 Toyland - Victor Herbert
 I'll be home for Christmas - Gannon/Kent/Ram
 By the fireside - Robert Schumann
 Count tour blessings - Berlin
 Christmas waltz - Cahn/Styne
 The Christmas song - Torme/Wells

The Magic Mood of Ronnie Aldrich 
 Charade - Henry Mancini
 Felicidade - Antonio Carlos Jobim
 I’ve grown accustomed to her face - Loewe/Lerner
 Ship of dreams - R. Aldrich
 I left my heart in San Francisco - Cross/Cory
 Softly as I leave you - DeVita, Calabrese/Shaper
 How soon - Mancini/Stillman
 I wish you love - Trenet/Beach
 The girl from Ipanema - Jobim
 The sound of music - Rodgers/Hammerstein
 Gardens in Ibiza - Aldrich
 People - Styne/Merrill

That Aldrich Feeling 
 My favorite things - Richard Rodgers-Oscar Hammerstein II
 Moonglow and theme from "Picnic" - Will Hudson-Eddie DeLange
 Melodie d’amour - Leo Johns - Henri Salvador
 Mona Lisa - Jay Livingston - Ray Evans
 Magic moments - Burt Bacharach/Hal David
 When I fall in love - Victor Young/ Edward Heyman (erroneously named as "Herman")
 Memories are made of this - Terry Gilkyson - Richard Dehr
 Spanish Harlem - Jerry Leiber - Phil Spector
 The sweetest sounds - Richard Rodgers
 Come closer to me (Acércate más - Real title) - Osvaldo Farrés
 If the rains got to fall - David Heneker
 If ever I would leave you - Alan Jay Lerner - Frederick Loewe

All-Time Piano Hits 
 Miserlou - Roubanis
 Bewitched - Rodgers
 Nola - Arndt
 Stardust - Hoagy Carmichael
 Near you - Craig
 Dancing in the dark - Schwartz
 Autumn leaves - Kosma
 Voodoo moon - Noro Morales
 As time goes by - Hupfeld
 Inka dinka doo - Ryan/Durante
 Canadian sunset - Haywood/Gimbel
 Exodus - Gold

Where The Sun Is 
 La playa - van Wetter
 Je te rechaufferai - Aznavour
 Strangers when we meet - Duning/Quine
 Nuages - Reinhardt/Larue
 Merveilleuse Angelique - Magne
 Till - Sigman/Danvers
 La bohème - Plante/Aznavour
 Cast your fate to the wind - Guaraldi/Werber
 Anema e core - D'Esposito/Manlio/Goell
 Sabor a mi - Carillo/Mitchell
 Are you lonesome tonight - Turk/Handman
 Michelle - Lennon/McCartney

Two Pianos in Hollywood 
 The shadow of your smile - Mandel/Webster
 Lara's theme - Webster/Jarre
 Strangers in the night - Kaempfert/Singleton
 Chim chim cheree - Richard & Robert Sherman
 Limelight - Charles Chaplin
 The Bible - Mayuzumi
 Who's afraid of Virginia Woolf? - North/Webster
 Moulin Rouge - Auric/Larue
 More - Oliviero/Ortolani
 The apartment - Williams
 A patch of blue - Goldsmith/Wayne
 Lawrence of Arabia - Jarre

Two Pianos Today! 
 You only live twice - Barry/Bricusse
 A whiter shade of pale - Reed/Brooker
 Georgy girl - Springfield/Dale
 Somethin’ stupid - Parks
 A man and a woman - Lai/Barouh
 My cup runneth over - Jones/Schmidt
 Don't sleep in the subway - Hatch/Trent
 Release me - Miller/Stevenson
 Barefoot in the park - Hefti/Mercer
 Alfie - David/Bacharach
 Music to watch girls by - Ramin
 This is my song - Charles Chaplin

For Young Lovers 
 Ode to Billie Joe - Gentry
 What the world needs now - Bacharach/David
 Love is blue - Popp/Cour
 Sunny - Hebb
 I think I'm going out of my head - Randazzo/Weinstein
 The impossible dream - Darion/Leigh
 Baby, now that I’ve found you - Macaulay/Macleod
 Valley of the dolls - A. Previn/D. Previn
 It must be him - Gilbert Becaud/David
 Up, up and away - Webb
 To sir with love - London/Black
 Born free - Barry/Black

This Way "In" 
 This guy's in love with you - Bacharach/David
 MacArthur Park - Webb
 Blowin’ in the wind - Bob Dylan
 Do it again - Wilson/Love
 Honey - Russell
 Time - Aldrich/Hendrix
 Mrs. Robinson - Simon
 By the time I get to Phoenix - Webb
 Mas que nada - Jorge Ben
 Theme from "The fox" - Lalo Schifrin
 A man without love - Panzeri/Pace
 Something here in my heart - Macleod Macaulay

It’s Happening Now 
 Hey Jude - Lennon/McCartney
 Ride my see-saw - Lodge
 Concierto de Aranjuez - Joaquín Rodrigo
 Light my fire - Morrison/Manzarek
 Scarborough fair - Trad., arr. Aldrich
 Both sides now - Mitchell
 Theme from "Elvira Madigan" - Mozart, arr. Aldrich
 Soulful strut - Record/Sanders
 The nature of love - R. Aldrich
 I’ve gotta be me - Marks
 Little green apples - Russell
 For once in my life - Miller/Murden

Destination Love 
 My cherie amour - Cosby/Wonder
 Aquarius - Rado/Ragni
 Midnight cowboy - Barry
 Classical gas - Williams
 Quentin's theme - Cobert
 Wichita lineman - Webb
 Baby I love you - Barry
 The windmills of your mind - Legrand/Bregman
 Theme from In the dark - Aldrich
 Love Me Tonight - Lorenzo Pilat/Mario Panzeri/Barry Mason
 Love theme from "Romeo and Juliet" - Nino Rota
 Good Morning Starshine - James Rado/Gerome Ragni/Galt MacDermot

Togetherness 
 "Airport" Love Theme - Newman +
 Raindrops keep falling on my head - Bacharach/David +
 Arizona - Young +
 Bridge over troubled water - Simon +
 Sugar, sugar - Barry/Kim +
 Daydream - Vincent/Van Holmen +
 Venus - Van Leeuwen +
 Because - Lennon/McCartney +
 United we stand - Hiller/Simons +
 Girl on the Via Veneto - R. Aldrich +
 Let it be - Lennon/McCartney +
 My heart reminds me (Autumn concerto) - Bargoni/Siegel +
 Something - Harrison ++
 Don't play that song - Ertegün ++
 The long and winding road - Lennon/McCartney ++
 Papier maché - Bacharach/David ++
 Make it with you - Gates ++
 Snowbird - MacLellan ++
 Cecilia - Simon ++
 Close to you - Bacharach/David ++
 Rider on the rain - Francis Lai ++
 My baby loves lovin’ - Cook ++
 The sound of silence - Paul Simon ++
 Sun-dance - R. Aldrich ++
Released as two separate albums in US:  Here Come The Hits! (+) and Close to You (++)

Love Story 
 It's impossible - Armando Manzanero
 I never promised you a rose garden - South
 My sweet Lord - Harrison
 Mr. Bojangles - Walker
 Woodstock - Mitchell
 I think I love you - Romeo
 Amazing grace - Trad. arr Aldrich
 What is life - Harrison
 Theme from "Love story" - Lai/Sigman
 Candida - Wine/Levine
 El cóndor pasa - Robles
 Togetherness - R. Aldrich

Great Themes to Remember 
 Symphony No. 40 - Mozart
 Meditation - Massenet
 Serenade - Schubert
 None but the lonely heart - Tchaikovsky
 Vocalise - Rachmaninoff
 Bacarolle - Offenbach/Guiraud/Barbier/Carre
 Nocturne - Borodin
 Serenade - Mozart
 Nocturne - Chopin
 Air on the G string - Bach
 Theme from piano concerto No. 21 - Mozart

Invitation to Love 
 Cherish - Kirkman
 Gypsys, tramps and thieves - Stone
 Theme from "Summer of 42" - Legrand
 I'd like to teach the world to sing - Backer/Davis
 Baby, I'm-a want you - Gates
 Theme from "The Onedin Line" - Kachaturian, arr Aldrich
 Theme from "The go-between" - Legrand
 I could be happy with you - Wilson
 Imagine - John Lennon
 Invitation to love - Taylor/Wolfson
 Diamonds are forever - Barry/Black

Come to Where The Love Is 
 Love theme from "The Godfather" - Nino Rota
 Alone again (Naturally) - R. O’Sullivan
 Song sung blue - Neil Diamond
 The impossible dream - M. Leigh/J. Darion
 Popcorn - Kingsley
 Where is the love - Salter/MacDonald
 Theme from "Lost horizon" - Bacharach/David
 The candy man - Bricusse/Newley
 Without you - Evans/Ham
 Come to where the love is - Taylor/Marc
 Breaking up is hard to do - Sedaka/Greenfield
 Jenny's theme from "Young Winston" - A. Ralston

The Phase 4 World of Burt Bacharach 
 Wives and lovers – Bacharach/David
 Alfie* – Bacharach/David
 Odds and ends – Bacharach/David
 Where there's a heartache – Bacharach/David
 This guy's in love with you* – Bacharach/David
 (They long to be) Close to you* – Bacharach/David
 What the world needs now is love* – Bacharach/David
 Raindrops keep fallin' on my head* – Bacharach/David
 The April fools – Bacharach/David
 Papier-mâché* – Bacharach/David
 The look of love – Bacharach/David
 (* previously released)

Soft and Wicked 
 Last tango in Paris - Gato Barbieri
 You're so vain - Simon
 Aubrey - Gates
 Tie a yellow ribbon round the old oak tree - Levine/Brown
 Clair - O’Sullivan
 Call me (come back home) Gree/Mitchell/Jackson
 Good time Charlie - O’Keefe
 Oh babe, what would you say - Smith
 Killing me softly with his song - Fox/Gimbel
 Last song - Evoy
 Love theme from "The Valachi Papers" - Ortolani
 It Never Rains in Southern California - Albert Hammond/Lee Hazlewood

Top of The World 
 Top of the world - R. Carpenter/J. Bettis
 Summer (The first time) - B. Goldsboro
 Vado via - E. Riccardi/L. Albertelli
 If I asked my heart - B. Taylor/R. Marc
 Ashes to ashes - D. Lambert/B. Potter
 I got a name - C. Fox/M. Gimbel
 Jesse - J. Ian
 Say, has anybody seen my sweet gypsy rose - I. Levine/L. Brown
 Children of Rome - S. Myers
 Touch me in the morning - M. Masser/R. Miller

The Way We Were 
 Love's theme - B. White
 The way we were - M. Hamlisch/A. Bergman
 Leave me alone (Ruby red dress) - D. & M. Laurie
 I'll have to say I love you in a song - J. Croce
 Have you heard - M. Pinder
 Last time I saw him - M. Masser/P. Sawyer
 What are you doing the rest of your life? - M. Legrand/A. Bergman
 Wave - Antonio Carlos Jobim
 Happiness is me and you - O’Sullivan
 Dark lady - J. Durrill

In The Gentle Hours 
 In the gentle hours - Aldrich
 You make me feel brand new - Bell/Creed
 She - Charles Aznavour/Kretzmer
 The entertainer - Joplin
 And I love you so - McLean
 Everybody's talkin' - Neil
 The first time ever I saw your face - MacColl
 Meditation - Antonio Carlos Jobim
 The old-fashioned way - Garvarentz/Aznavour
 Yesterday - Lennon/McCartney
 You are the sunshine of my life - Stevie Wonder
 Didn't we - Webb

Love 
 Love - R. Aldrich
 Quiet nights of quiet stars - Antonio Carlos Jobim
 The nearness of you - H. Carmichael
 I didn't know what time it was - R. Rodgers/L. Hart
 Once upon a summertime - M. Legrand
 All the things you are - J. Kern/O. Hammerstein
 Days of wine and roses - H. Mancini/J. Mercer
 I will wait for you - M. Legrand/N. Gimbel
 Tenderly - W. Gross/J. Lawrence
 The sound of love - B. Taylor/R. Marc
 Watch what happens - M. Legrand/N. Gimbel
 The party's over - J. Styne/B. Comden

Reflections 
 Summer's end - R. Aldrich
 Never gonna fall in love again - E. Carmen
 Times of your life - R. Nichols/B. Lane
 Spanish eyes - E. Snyder/B. Kaempfert
 Save your kisses for me - T. Hiller/L. Sheriden
 How insensitive - A. Jobim/V. DeMoraes
 Adagio - Trad, arr Aldrich
 On days like these - D. Black/Q. Jones
 Scarlet ribbons - E. Danzig/J. Segal
 Love is a many splendored thing - F. Webster/S. Fain
 All by myself - E. Carmen

Webb Country 
 MacArthur Park - Jim Webb
 Lovers such as I - Jim Webb
 By the time I get to Phoenix - Jim Webb
 Paper chase - Jim Webb
 Wichita lineman - Jim Webb
 Galveston - Jim Webb
 Didn't we - Jim Webb
 Walk in the sunshine - Jim Webb
 The moon is a harsh mistress - Jim Webb
 Up, up and away - Jim Webb

With Love and Understanding (1977) 
 A little love and understanding - Becaud/Amade
 Evergreen - Williams/Streisand
 Forever and ever - Vlavianos/Costandinos
 Feelings - Albert
 Dancing queen - S. Anderson/Ulvaeus
 When a child is born - Zacar/Jay *
 When forever has gone - Vlavianos/Mason
 Nadia's theme - DeVorzan/Botkin
 Theme from "King Kong" - Barry
 Summer of my life - May
 Aria - Bembo/Bardotti
 Gabriella - R. Aldrich
Released as "Evergreen" in US.  (*)not included in American release.

Melodies from The Classics 
 Pavane - Faure
 Rondò alla turca - Mozart
 Cavatina - Raff
 Moment musical - Schubert
 Gymnopedie - Satie
 Andaluzia (Spanish dance Nº 5) - Granados
 Badinerie (from suite Nº 2) - Bach
 Adagio (from sonata Pathetique) - Beethoven
 La mattinata de Leoncavallo
 Romance (from violin concerto Nº 2) - Wieniawski
 Anitra's dance (from Peer Gynt) - Grieg
 Reverie - Debussy

Emotions 
 Emotions - B. Gibb/R. Gibb
 Exotica - R. Aldrich
 The name of the game - B. Anderson/B. Ulvaeus
 How deep is your love - B. Gibb/M. Gibb
 Star wars suite: a) Main theme b) Cantina band c) Princess theme - J. Williams
 Take a chance on me - Anderson/Ulvaeus
 Cavatina - S. Myers/H Shaper
 Just for you - A. Price
 Don't cry for me Argentina from "Evita" - A. Lloyd-Webber/T. Rice
 You Light up my life - J. Brooks
 Suite from Close encounters of the third kind - J. Williams

Tomorrow's Yesterdays 
 A Certain Smile - Webster/Fain
 I'm stone in love with you - Bell/Creed/Bell
 Tomorrow's Yesterdays - R. Aldrich
 When I need you - Hammond/Sayer
 Desafinado - Jobim/Cavanaugh/Hendricks/Mendonca
 Nights in white satin - Hayward
 The fool on the hill - Lennon/McCartney
 I say a little prayer - Bacharach/David
 I'm not in love - Goddman/Stewart
 Love me tender - Presley/Matson
 If you leave me now - Cetera
 Lucy in the sky with diamonds - Lennon/McCartney

For The One You Love 
 You needed me - Goodrum
 The main event/Fight - Jabara/Roberts
 She believes in me - Gibb
 Just when I needed you most - Vanwarmer
 Can't smile without you - Arnold/Martin/Morrow
 I know I'll never love this way again - Kerr/Jennings
 Gypsomania - R. Aldrich
 Reunited - Feskaris/Perren
 Just the way you are - Joel
 You take my breath away - Lawrence/Hart
 You're the only one - Sager/Roberts
 After the love has gone - Foster/Graydon/Champlin

One Fine Day 
 Woman in love
 One fine day
 Shadow waltz
 Fame
 On Broadway
 Stand by me
 Reminiscing
 Autumn tears
 Magic
 Romeo's tune

Silver Bells / Winter Wonderland 
 Winter wonderland
 Silent night
 The holly and the ivy
 O come all ye faithful
 Sleigh ride
 Let it snow
 White Christmas
 Silver bells
 The Christmas song
 Jingle bells

Imagine 
 It's my turn
 So far away
 Crying
 Blue skies
 Imagine
 Should I´ve ever let her go
 Blessed are the believers
 Super trouper
 Intermezzo
 Put your hand on my shoulder
 I made it through the rain
 I'm happy just to dance with you
 California girls
 She's out of my life
 Morning train
 What kind of fool
 I remember
 Sexy eyes
 Daytime friends
 Cupid

Night Birds 
 Beguin the begine - Porter
 Arthur's theme - Bacharach
 Memory from ¨Cats¨ - Lloyd Webber
 Santa Catalina - R. Aldrich
 Hill street blues - Post
 Chariots of fire - Vangelis
 Night birds - Sharpe
 Have you ever been in love? - Danter/Hill/Sinfield
 A little peace - Siegel/Meinunger/Greedus
 Albareda - R. Aldrich
 Stay - Manilow
 For Lisa - Beethoven arr. Aldrich

Sea Dreams 
 La mer - Trenet
 Hello - Richie
 Sailing by - Binge
 Bermuda triangle - Manilow
 The sound of the sea - R. Aldrich
 The last farewell - Whitaker
 Calypso - Denver
 Stranger on the shore - Bilk
 Sailing - Sutherland
 Trade winds - R. Aldrich
 All the girls I´ve loved before - Hammond/David
 How deep is the ocean? - Berlin

For All Seasons 
 April in Paris - Duke/Harburg
 Spring song - Mendelssohn arr. Aldrich
 It might as well be spring - Rodgers/Hammerstein II
 Summertime - Gershwin/Heyward
 The solway in summer - R. Aldrich
 Summer wind - Mayer
 Early autumn - Herman/Burns/Mercer
 September song - Weill/Anderson
 Forever autumn - Osbourne/Vigrass/Wayne
 When winter comes - R. Aldrich
 Winter world of love - Reed/Mason
 June in January - Rainger/Robin

Today in the Old Fashioned Way 
 I'd like to teach the world to s(w)ing
 The way we were
 Sing
 The old fashioned way
 Wonderful baby
 Oh Babe, what would you say
 You are the sunshine of my life
 (They long to be) close to you
 There's a kind of hush
 Song sung blue
 Clair
 Tie a yellow ribbon round the old oak tree

References

Other sources
 Ronnie Aldrich (Obituary), The Times (London, England), 15 October 1993, p. 21
 Ronnie Aldrich (Obituary), The Daily Telegraph (London, England), 9 October 1993, p. 21

External links
 Ronnie Aldrich in the Internet Movie Database
 Ronnie Aldrich and The Squadronaires in the Internet Movie Database

1916 births
1993 deaths
Easy listening musicians
Deaths from prostate cancer
People from Erith
People educated at The Harvey Grammar School
Decca Records artists
London Records artists
20th-century English musicians
English conductors (music)
British male conductors (music)
English music arrangers
English pianists
Dance band bandleaders
20th-century British conductors (music)
The Squadronaires members
20th-century British male musicians
20th-century British musicians
Deaths from cancer in the Isle of Man